Richard Alan Snell (December 19, 1955 – February 21, 2006) was an American make-up artist. Known as a master of prosthetic makeup, he won two Primetime Emmy Awards and received an Academy Award nomination.

Awards and nominations

Academy Awards

Primetime Emmy Awards

Death
Snell was found dead on February 21, 2006, in his hotel room in Freeport, The Bahamas after not reporting to work on the set of the film Pirates of the Caribbean: At World's End. He died in his sleep of natural causes at age 50.

References

External links

1955 births
2006 deaths
People from San Francisco
American make-up artists
Emmy Award winners